Rrogozhinë is a town and a municipality in Tirana County, centrally located in the Western Lowlands region of Albania. It was formed at the 2015 local government reform by the merger of the former municipalities Gosë, Kryevidh, Lekaj, Rrogozhinë and Sinaballaj, that became municipal units. The seat of the municipality is the town Rrogozhinë. The total population is 22,148 (2011 census), in a total area of 223.73 km2. The population of the former municipality at the 2011 census was 7,049.

Villages
Municipal Unit
 Gosë
 Lekaj
 Kryevidh
 Sinaballaj

See also
 FK Egnatia

References

 
Municipalities in Tirana County
Administrative units of Rrogozhinë